August Neuburger (December 22, 1902 – February 2, 1999) was a German politician of the Christian Democratic Union (CDU) and former member of the German Bundestag.

Life 
Neuburger was a member of the German Bundestag from its first election in 1949 to 1961. He represented the Bruchsal constituency in parliament as a directly elected member of parliament. From 1949 to 1953 Neuburger was chairman of the Capital Committee of the Bundestag.

Literature

References

1902 births
1999 deaths
Members of the Bundestag for Baden-Württemberg
Members of the Bundestag 1957–1961
Members of the Bundestag 1953–1957
Members of the Bundestag 1949–1953
Members of the Bundestag for the Christian Democratic Union of Germany